Kelvin van der Linde (born 20 June 1996) is a South African racing driver currently competing as a substitute driver in Formula E with the ABT Team. He made his GT Masters debut in 2014, also winning the championship that year, a feat he repeated in 2019. He won the 2017 24 Hours of Nürburgring.

Racing career 

Born and raised in South Africa, Kelvin van der Linde started his racing career in Karting at the age of 8 in 2005.

In 2011, he became the youngest ever driver to compete in a National South African Circuit event at age 14 and then went on to become South Africa’s youngest ever National Champion at the age of 16 years and 128 days the following year.

2013 was a breakthrough year when he won his first International Championship. At the age of 17, Van Der Linde became the youngest ever winner of the Volkswagen Scirocco R-Cup and earned his place as a Volkswagen supported Junior driver for the 2014 season. Leading on from the previous year’s success, he wrapped up back to back European titles when he became the youngest ever ADAC GT Masters Champion at age 18 driving an Audi R8 LMS Ultra.

In 2015, Van Der Linde was promoted to the role of Audi factory driver, winning some of the world’s most prestigious events in the years that followed, including the 2017 Nürburgring 24H and Suzuka 10H.

2021
In 2021, Van Der Linde competed in the Deutsche Tourenwagen Masters for Abt Sportsline. He won four races and finished third in the drivers' championship. Going into the final round of the season, he was fighting for the drivers' championship title with Liam Lawson and Maximilian Götz. 

During both of the final races of the Championship at the Norisring, Van Der Linde had similar incidents with Lawson. In the first race, Van Der Linde dived down the inside of Liam, with Liam finished in 3rd. In the second race the consequences were much more serious; Lawson's car was damaged in a first-lap collision with Van Der Linde, who again dived down the inside of Lawson, taking Lawson out of contention for the title as he finished 18th. Van Der Linde was then given a five-second time penalty as a result. Towards the end of the race, Van Der Linde suffered a puncture in a battle with Götz and lost his chances to win the title, which eventually went to Götz after Mercedes issued team orders to the cars ahead of the latter to guarantee he finished 1st. 

The move was widely condemned, with some believing Van Der Linde did it deliberately. Red Bull motorsport advisor Helmut Marko called for him to be banned,  and Lawson himself did not hold back his anger after the race, stating Kelvin was an 'idiot' and the 'dirtiest guy I'd ever raced against.' Van der Linde would later apologize.

2022
Days before the final round of the 2021 DTM season, Abt Sportsline confirmed him as their driver for the 2022 season. After finishing ninth in points in 2022, van der Linde returned to the team for 2023.

Formula E

ABT CUPRA Formula E Team (2023–)

2022–23 season 
After Robin Frijns sustained a hand injury at the 2023 Mexico City ePrix, Van Der Linde was called upon to replace him at ABT Cupra for the rounds at Diriyah. In his first weekend in single-seater racing, the South African managed to finish 16th during the first race and 18th on Saturday, which he stated gave him a base to build upon for the following event.

Racing record

Career summary 

† As Van Der Linde was a guest driver, he was ineligible for points.
* Season still in progress.

Complete ADAC GT Masters results 
(key) (Races in bold indicate pole position) (Races in italics indicate fastest lap)

Complete TCR International Series results 
(key) (Races in bold indicate pole position) (Races in italics indicate fastest lap)

† Driver did not finish the race, but was classified as he completed over 90% of the race distance.

Complete Bathurst 12 Hour results

Complete Asian Le Mans Series results 
(key) (Races in bold indicate pole position) (Races in italics indicate fastest lap)

Complete Deutsche Tourenwagen Masters results 
(key) (Races in bold indicate pole position) (Races in italics indicate fastest lap)

Complete Formula E results
(key) (Races in bold indicate pole position; races in italics indicate fastest lap)

* Season still in progress.

References

External links 
 
 

1996 births
Living people
ADAC GT Masters drivers
South African racing drivers
TCR International Series drivers
Sportspeople from Johannesburg
24 Hours of Daytona drivers
24 Hours of Spa drivers
24H Series drivers
White South African people
Deutsche Tourenwagen Masters drivers
Blancpain Endurance Series drivers
Nürburgring 24 Hours drivers
Formula E drivers
Abt Sportsline drivers
Cupra Racing drivers
Engstler Motorsport drivers
South African expatriate sportspeople in Germany